Khan Na Yao is one of the 50 districts (khet) of Bangkok, Thailand. It is bounded by other Bangkok districts (from north clockwise): Bang Khen, Khlong Sam Wa, Min Buri, Saphan Sung, and Bueng Kum.

History
Khan Na Yao was separated from Bueng Kum on 14 October 1997 announcement, effective 21 November 1997, together with Saphan Sung.

Its name means "long paddy-field ridge", describing the geography of the district; Khan Na Yao was an agricultural district.

Administration
The district is divided into two sub-districts (khwaeng).

Places
 Wat Rat Sattha Tham
 Navatanee Golf Course
 Siam Park City
 Fashion Island
 Bangchan Industrial Estate

District council
The District Council for Khan Na Yao has seven members, who each serve four-year terms. Elections were last held on 30 April 2006. The Thai Rak Thai Party won seven seats.

References

External links
 BMA website with the tourist landmarks of Khan Na Yao
 Khan Na Yao district office (Thai only)

 
Districts of Bangkok